Malin Valley is an upland valley on the west side of Mount Cerberus in the east of the Olympus Range, McMurdo Dry Valleys, Antarctica. The valley opens north to Victoria Valley. It was named by the Advisory Committee on Antarctic Names in 2004 after Michael C. Malin of the Department of Geology at Arizona State University who made abrasion rate observations in the McMurdo Dry Valleys for the United States Antarctic Program between 1983–84 and 1993–94.

References

Valleys of Victoria Land
McMurdo Dry Valleys